In mathematics, Deligne cohomology is the hypercohomology of the Deligne complex of a complex manifold. It was introduced by Pierre Deligne in unpublished work in about 1972  as a cohomology theory for algebraic varieties that includes both ordinary cohomology and intermediate Jacobians.

Definition

The analytic Deligne complex Z(p)D, an on a complex analytic manifold X iswhere Z(p) = (2π i)pZ. Depending on the context,  is either the complex of smooth (i.e., C∞) differential forms or of holomorphic forms, respectively.
The Deligne cohomology  is the q-th hypercohomology of the Deligne complex. An alternative definition of this complex is given as the homotopy limit of the diagram

Properties

Deligne cohomology groups  can be described geometrically, especially in low degrees. For p = 0, it agrees with the q-th singular cohomology group (with Z-coefficients), by definition. For q = 2 and p = 1, it is isomorphic to the group of isomorphism classes of smooth (or holomorphic, depending on the context) principal C×-bundles over X. For p = q = 2, it is the group of isomorphism classes of C×-bundles with connection. For q = 3 and p = 2 or 3, descriptions in terms of gerbes are available. This has been generalized to a description in higher degrees in terms of iterated classifying spaces and connections on them.

Relation with Hodge classes 
Recall there is a subgroup  of integral cohomology classes in  called the group of Hodge classes. There is an exact sequence relating Deligne-cohomology, their intermediate Jacobians, and this group of Hodge classes as a short exact sequence

Applications
Deligne cohomology is used to formulate Beilinson conjectures on special values of L-functions.

Extensions 
There is an extension of Deligne-cohomology defined for any symmetric spectrum  where  for  odd which can be compared with ordinary Deligne cohomology on complex analytic varieties.

See also 

 Bundle gerbe
 Motivic cohomology
Hodge structure
Intermediate Jacobian

References

 Deligne-Beilinson cohomology
 Geometry of Deligne cohomology
 Notes on differential cohomology and gerbes
 Twisted smooth Deligne cohomology
Bloch's Conjecture, Deligne Cohomology and Higher Chow Groups

Sheaf theory
Homological algebra
Cohomology theories